From Spain With Love with Annie Sibonney is a Canadian reality television series, which aired on Food Network in Canada and the Cooking Channel in the United States. Produced by Shaftesbury Films, the series premiered in 2011.

Hosted by Toronto-based broadcaster and culinary tour operator Annie Sibonney, the series profiles the cuisine of Spain.

The series also aired on Food Network in Europe, LifeStyle Food in Australia, Asian Food Channel in Southeast Asia and Fox Life India.

After the end of the program's run, Sibonney created the new series One Night Stand with Annie Sibonney.

Restaurants featured

 Chikito
 Cinc Sentits
 El fogón de Trifón

References

External links
 

2011 Canadian television series debuts
2011 Canadian television series endings
2010s Canadian reality television series
Canadian travel television series
Food travelogue television series
English-language television shows
Television series by Shaftesbury Films
Food Network (Canadian TV channel) original programming
Television shows filmed in Spain